Eduardo Estrada may refer to:
 Eduardo Estrada (cyclist)
 Eduardo Estrada (wrestler)